Robert Lee Hall (July 19, 1922 – January 24, 1990) was an architect based in Memphis, Tennessee who established the firm of Robert Lee Hall and Associates. He designed Clark Tower in East Memphis, 100 North Main in downtown Memphis, and Patterson Hall at the University of Memphis.

Hall was born in Jackson, Tennessee. He worked at Fisher Body aircraft plant in Memphis where he met Annie Laurie McGee, a Memphis socialite, whom he married in 1943. He served in the Army Air Corps during World War II.

His firm eventually became a partnership with his former associate Ben Waller as Hall & Waller Architects.

Hall was an alderman in Germantown, Tennessee and served on the city planning board. He was also a Shriner and belonged to the Kiwanis Club. He had four children. He was also a boyscout leader.

He was president of the American Institute of Architects Memphis branch in 1972.

He is buried at Memorial Park Cemetery in Memphis.

Hall graduated from the Memphis Academy of Arts (Memphis College of Art).

He was given an honorary architecture degree from the University of Tennessee.  He was a trustee at the 
Germantown United Methodist Church.

Work
Clark Tower (1970 - 1971) in East Memphis. Renovated in 2004. 
Patterson Hall at the University of Memphis
Clark Oil building on 6th Street in Milwaukee
Old Holiday Inn in Rivermont
Building similar to 100 North Main, but without the revolving restaurant,  in Milwaukee, Wisconsin 
100 North Main (1965) in downtown Memphis, the city's tallest building.
Parkway Towers (1968) in Nashville, Tennessee
International Trade Mart (World Trade Center New Orleans) building (now the Four Seasons Hotel and Private Residences New Orleans) (1967) in New Orleans, Louisiana, associate architect with Edward Durell Stone NRHP listed
The Troubadour (1967)	in New Orleans, Louisiana
iBank Tower, also known as White Station Tower, (1965) at 5050 Poplar Avenue in Memphis, Tennessee
 136 East South Temple	(1965) in Salt Lake City, Utah
University Club Building in Salt Lake City with ashley Carpenter
Anthony Wayne Bank Building (1964) in Fort Wayne, Indiana Converted into the Anthony Wayne Building, a condo tower, in 2011.
River Tower at South Bluffs (1964) in	Memphis, Tennessee	
633 Building (1962) in Milwaukee, Wisconsin
Mid-South Coliseum with Furbringer and Merrill G. Ehrman

References

1922 births
1990 deaths
People from Memphis, Tennessee
20th-century American architects
Architects from Tennessee
People from Jackson, Tennessee
United States Army Air Forces personnel of World War II